Sara Isabel Fonseca Moreira  (born 17 October 1985) is a Portuguese runner who competes in cross country, road running and in middle-distance and long-distance track events. She represents Sporting CP at club level.

After contributing for three collective European cross-country titles and winning individual silver and bronze medals in other championships, she secured her first individual senior title with the 3000 metres gold medal at the 2013 European Athletics Indoor Championships in Gothenburg. At the 2016 European Athletics Championships, Moreira won her first major outdoor individual title by taking the gold medal in the debuting half marathon event.

Career

Sara Isabel Fonseca Moreira was born in Santo Tirso, Portugal, Moreira's first international athletics competition was the 2007 European Athletics U23 Championships, where she took the bronze medal in the steeplechase. She attended the 2007 World Championships in Athletics the following year and finished in thirteenth place in the final. The following year she took part in two major competitions: the IAAF World Cross Country Championships where she finished 50th in the senior race, and then the 2008 Summer Olympics later that year, where she failed to get past the heats of the steeplechase competition.

The 2009 saw Moreira take on an extensive competitive schedule. In March 2009, she won the silver medal at the European Indoor Championships with a new personal best of 8:48.18 – her first senior medal. A sixteenth-place finish at the 2009 IAAF World Cross Country Championships saw her help the Portuguese women to a team bronze, along with Ana Dulce Félix. She scored a series of gold medals in July, starting with a 5000 metres and steeplechase double at the 2009 Summer Universiade (which included a Universiade record in the steeplechase), followed by another 5000 m gold at the 2009 Lusophony Games. At the 2009 World Championships in Athletics she missed out on the steeplechase final but managed to finish tenth in the women's 5000 m contest. Having competed extensively from March to August, Moreira's final competition of 2009 was the 2009 European Cross Country Championships in December, where she finished tenth and won the team gold with Portugal.

Moreira started her 2010 campaign at the 2010 IAAF World Indoor Championships in Doha and she finished sixth in the final of the 3000 metres, the second best European performer after Ethiopian-born Alemitu Bekele Degfa, who competed for Turkey. Later that month she ran at the 2010 IAAF World Cross Country Championships and finished in 27th place (the fifth best European performer). She took third place at the European Cup 10000m in June 2010, making her debut over 10,000 metres, and also helped win the women's team title for Portugal with Inês Monteiro and Fernanda Ribeiro. She recorded a 3000 m personal best shortly after at the Gran Premio de Andalucía, where her time of 8:42.69 brought her third place behind Nuria Fernández.

At the 2010 European Athletics Championships she secured a 5000 m bronze medal, setting a personal best of 14:54.71, but dropped out of the 10,000 m mid-race. She was selected to run the 3000 m for Europe at the 2010 IAAF Continental Cup, but she finished in seventh place. A ninth-place finish at the 2010 European Cross Country Championships helped Portugal to the team gold medal. She ended the year with a win at the São Silvestre da Amadora 10K race on New Year's Eve.

Her 2011 began with a third-place finish at the European Cross Country Club Championships, hosted at the Cinque Mulini, where her club, Maratona Clube de Portugal, came second in the women's team race. She came seventh over 1500 m at the 2011 European Athletics Indoor Championships and was twentieth in the senior race at the 2011 IAAF World Cross Country Championships later that year. After fellow Portuguese Augusto dropped out of the European Cup 10000m, she took on the favourite role and won the title, five seconds clear of Christelle Daunay. Moreira tested positive for the prohibited stimulant, methylhexaneamine at the 2011 World Championships in Athletics. Her result was annulled and she was banned for six months.

Upon her return, she won the Douro Valley Half Marathon in May, the European Cup 10000m title in June, then a bronze medal in the 5000 m at the 2012 European Athletics Championships. She gained selection for the Portuguese Olympic team and ran a personal best of 31:16.44 minutes to place fourteenth in the 10,000 m Olympic final. She defeated Berhane Adere to win the Great Birmingham Run in October and placed twelfth at the 2012 European Cross Country Championships.

Achievements

See also
 List of doping cases in sport

References

External links

1985 births
Living people
People from Santo Tirso
Portuguese female middle-distance runners
Portuguese female long-distance runners
Portuguese female steeplechase runners
Olympic athletes of Portugal
Athletes (track and field) at the 2008 Summer Olympics
Athletes (track and field) at the 2012 Summer Olympics
Athletes (track and field) at the 2016 Summer Olympics
European Athletics Championships medalists
World Athletics Championships athletes for Portugal
Doping cases in athletics
Portuguese sportspeople in doping cases
Universiade medalists in athletics (track and field)
Universiade gold medalists for Portugal
Universiade silver medalists for Portugal
Golden Globes (Portugal) winners
Medalists at the 2011 Summer Universiade
Medalists at the 2009 Summer Universiade
Athletes (track and field) at the 2020 Summer Olympics
Sportspeople from Porto District